The View from This Tower is the only full-length album by the American post-hardcore band Faraquet. It was released on Dischord Records in 2000 (Dischord #122). The album was the band's fourth, and last, recorded work.

Production
The album was produced in part by J. Robbins.

Critical reception

The Washington Post wrote that "the band has no interest in comfortable or communal moments ... Its stand-offishness, however, is frequently bracing." Exclaim! called the album "a mesmerising blend of jagged, jazz-tinged, indie math rock."

Track listing
 "Cut Self Not" SOUTHERN | faraquet > the view... > audio
 "Carefully Planned"
 "The Fourth Introduction"
 "Song for Friends to Me"
 "Conceptual Separation of Self" (Cello performed by Amy Domingues)
 "Study in Complacency"
 "Sea Song"
 "The View from This Tower"
 "The Missing Piece"

References 

2000 albums
Faraquet albums